Napier is a New Zealand parliamentary electorate, returning one Member of Parliament to the House of Representatives. It is named after the city of Napier, the main urban area within the electorate. The electorate was established for the 1861 election and has existed since. Since the 2014 general election, Napier has been held by Stuart Nash of the New Zealand Labour Party. Previously, it had been held by Chris Tremain of the New Zealand National Party, who stood down prior to the 2014 election.

Population centres
The electorate includes the following population centres:
 Napier
 Taradale
 Wairoa
 Frasertown
 Nūhaka

History
The electorate was created in 1861, and preceded by the  electorate from 1853 to 1860 and then briefly the  electorate in 1860. It was a two-member electorate from 1876 to 1881.

The first representative was Henry Powning Stark, who won the election on 19 February 1861.

There were speculations that Douglas Maclean would be the conservative candidate in the Napier electorate in the  upon his return from England instead of George Swan, but this was not correct. Swan contested the election and was successful against the Liberal Party candidate Michael Gannon.

Brown, at the time Mayor of Napier and previously MP for Napier for many years, withdrew just before the election, but too late for his name to be excluded from the ballot papers. The election was won by Barnard.

Labour's Russell Fairbrother was first elected in the electorate in the 2002 election, replacing long-standing MP Geoff Braybrooke. In the 2008 election, Tremain retained the electorate with an increased majority over Fairbrother.

Tremain announced in September 2013 that he would not contest the 2014 election. Wayne Walford succeeded Tremain as National's candidate for the seat, Stuart Nash contested the electorate for the Labour Party for the second time, and Garth McVicar stood for the Conservative Party. McVicar had a high-profile due to his previous involvement with the Sensible Sentencing Trust lobby group. In July 2014, Walford was referred to Police by the Electoral Commission for breaching the Electoral Act by failing to display an authorisation statement on his campaign vehicle.

Nash had a majority of 3,850 votes over Walford. McVicar's 7,603 votes split the traditional National Party votes (24.8% of electors who gave their party vote to National gave their electorate vote to McVicar, a total of 4,465 votes), which helped Nash win the election.

Members of Parliament
Unless otherwise stated, all MPs terms began and ended at a general election.

Key

single-member electorate

multi-member electorate

single-member electorate

List MPs
Members of Parliament elected from party lists in elections where that person also unsuccessfully contested the Napier electorate. Unless otherwise stated, all MPs terms began and ended at general elections.

Election results

2020 election

2017 election

2014 election

2011 election

Electorate (as at 26 November 2011): 44,266

2008 election

2005 election

2002 election

1999 election

1996 election

1993 election

1990 election

1987 election

1984 election

1981 election

1978 election

1975 election

1972 election

1969 election

1966 election

1963 election

1960 election

1957 election

1954 election

1951 election

1949 election

1946 election

1943 election

1938 election

1935 election

1931 election

1928 election

1925 election

1922 election

1919 election

1914 election

1911 election

1908 election

1905 election

1902 election

1899 election

1893 election

1890 election

1877 by-election

1861 by-election

Table footnotes

Notes

References

External links
Electorate Profile  Parliamentary Library

New Zealand electorates
Napier, New Zealand
1860 establishments in New Zealand